Alucita homotrocha is a species of moth of the family Alucitidae. It is known from Zimbabwe.

References

Endemic fauna of Zimbabwe
Alucitidae
Lepidoptera of Zimbabwe
Moths of Sub-Saharan Africa
Moths described in 1921
Taxa named by Edward Meyrick